Daraq (also known as Dara, Daragh, and Darah) is a village in Zonuzaq Rural District, in the Central District of Marand County, East Azerbaijan Province, Iran. At the 2006 census, its population was 359, in 90 families.

References 

Populated places in Marand County